The wildlife of Sweden includes the diverse flora and fauna of Sweden. Habitats include mountain heath, montane forests, tundra, taiga, beech forests, rivers, lakes, bogs, brackish and marine coasts and cultivated land. The climate is in general very mild for a country at this latitude, because of the significant maritime influence.

Geography 

Sweden is an elongated country to the east of Norway and to the west of the Baltic Sea and the Gulf of Bothnia. It extends from a latitude of 55°N (like Newcastle or Moscow) to more than 70°N, which is north of the Arctic Circle. To the southwest lie the sea areas of the Skagerrak and the Kattegat, while in the northeast is the land border with Finland, marked by Torne River. The coastline is much indented with many small islands and two larger ones in the Baltic Sea, Gotland and Öland. Lakes are numerous, ranging in size from small ponds to Vänern, the third largest lake in Europe. 

Most of northern and central Sweden, roughly N of the large river Dalälven, constitutes the Norrland terrain which consists of large, barren areas of hilly and mountainous land gradually rising from the Gulf of Bothnia to the Scandinavian mountains (or Scandes) in the west. These mountains, which form the border with Norway in the north, are mostly around 1000 m, but Kebnekaise reaches 2100 m, the tallest mountain in Sweden and in N Scandinavia. The geology of the Scandes is quite diverse, which is often reflected in differences in the flora. South of Dalälven is a lowlying area surrounding the large lakes Mälaren and Hjälmaren. Clayey, fertile soils that originated as marine deposits during the latest glaciation, characterise this area, which constitutes one of the main agricultural regions in Sweden. To the south, there are some minor hilly and barren areas, such as Tiveden. East and West of lake Vättern are intensively cultivated plains on sedimentary rock. To the south of this region, the land rises again to the South Swedish highlands, a terrain of mostly barren hills reaching 377 m. The southernmost province of Scania differs from the rest of Sweden in consisting almost entirely of, mostly flat, arable land, and also in its complex geology which includes mesozoic rocks and abrasion coasts. Most of Sweden otherwise consists of gneiss and granite, sometimes, as in the N part of the west coast and around Stockholm, forming an archipelago of, typically fairly small, bare, rounded rocks (Sw. "skärgård"). The baltic islands Öland and Gotland consist almost entirely of Ordovician and Silurian limestone, respectively.

Climate 

Despite its northerly latitude, most parts of Sweden have a temperate climate with few temperature extremes. Climatically, the country can be divided into three regions; the northernmost part has a subarctic climate, the central part a humid continental climate and the southernmost part an oceanic climate. The country is much warmer and drier than other places at a similar latitude, mainly because of the combination of the Gulf Stream and the general westerly direction of the wind. The northern half of the country gets less rainfall than Norway because of the rain shadow effect caused by the Scandinavian Mountains.

Biodiversity 

There are an estimated 50,000 species of animals and plants in terrestrial habitats in Sweden; this represents 32% of the total species found in Europe. These include 73 species of mammal, ca. 240 breeding bird species (and another 60 or so non-breeding species seen yearly to rarely), 6 species of reptile, 12 species of amphibian, 56 species of freshwater fish, around 2000 species of vascular plant, close to 1000 bryophyte species and over 2000 lichens.

Sweden had a 2019 Forest Landscape Integrity Index mean score of 5.35/10, ranking it 103th globally out of 172 countries.

Flora and vegetation

Skåne and a narrow strip along the west coast belong to the nemoral zone where beech (Fagus sylvatica) is the dominant tree species. Forest herbs in this zone commonly vegetate and flower in spring, as the crown of beech is very dense, and little light reaches the ground once the leaves appear.  Examples are Anemone spp. and Corydalis spp.  Oak (Quercus robur and Quercus petraea) forest occurs on poor soils. Forest of alder (Alnus glutinosa), ash (Fraxinus excelsior) and elm (Ulmus glabra) grow in nutrient-rich, often wet soil, but most of these areas have long since been drained and converted to arable fields.

Most of Sweden below the mountains is covered by conifer forest and forms part of the circumboreal zone. South of river Dalälven, there are scattered deciduous trees like oak (Quercus robur), and this zone is referred to as boreo-nemoral. North of Dalälven, in the proper boreal (taiga) zone, deciduous trees are rarer, but birches (Betula pubescens and Betula pendula) and aspen (Populus tremula) may be abundant in early successional stages, such as after fire or in recently clear-cut areas. There are a total of four native conifers in Sweden, and of these only Norway spruce (Picea abies) and Scots pine (Pinus sylvestris) form forests, in pure or mixed stands. Spruce grows wetter and pine drier, but in bogs there are often numerous dwarfed pines. Undergrowth in spruce forest is commonly almost pure stands of bilberry (Vaccinium myrtillus). In wetter types ferns (e. g. Athyrium filix-femina and Dryopteris spp.) are abundant and in richer parts herbs (e. g., Paris quadrifolia, Actaea spicata) and broad-leaved grasses (e. g. Milium effusum). In pine forest, lingonberries (Vaccinium vitis-idaea), heather (Calluna vulgaris) and/or Cladonia lichens are most common. Fires occur at irregular intervals, and usually kill all spruce and most pines. Fireweed (Epilobium angustifolium), raspberry (Rubus idaeus) and Geranium bohemicum are among the first plants to germinate in the ashes.

In the mountains, the conifers are replaced by birch (Betula pubescens ssp. tortuosa), which forms the tree-line in most areas. The undergrowth in these forests is quite variable. Under wet and nutrient-rich conditions, a luxuriant vegetation may develop, consisting of tall herbs such as Aconitum septentrionale, Angelica archangelica and Cicerbita alpina. Above the birch forest, starting at 300–1000 m, depending on latitude, there are usually willow-thickets, and above these alpine heath or meadows, the former dominated by dwarf shrubs of the family Ericaceae, the latter by sedges, rushes and various herbs such as Saxifraga spp., Dryas octopetala and Draba spp. Ranunculus glacialis reaches the highest altitude of all plants in Sweden, often growing near the ever-shrinking glaciers.

Wetlands cover large areas in Sweden. In the south, raised bogs are a common variety, of which a striking example is Store Mosse. These bogs largely consist of living and dead Sphagnum spp., with scattered dwarf shrubs and sedges such as Eriophorum vaginatum. In the wet southwest, Narthecium ossifragum and Erica tetralix occur in the bogs, while in the north and the east, the dwarf birch Betula nana and Ledum palustre, an evergreen shrub, are common. Rich fens, with many sedges and orchids, are rather rare, except on Gotland and Öland, two large limestone islands in the Baltic, where Cladium-dominated fens are common. In the north of Sweden, there are many large mire complexes with both fen- and bog-like parts. The largest is found in Sjaunja, a nature reserve in Lapland. 

Sweden has as many as 90000 lakes bigger than one hectare. Most of these are either nutrient-poor with clear water and few plants (e.g. Lobelia dortmanna and Isoëtes spp.), like lake Vattern, or small ponds with brown water surrounded by floating mats of bog vegetation (e.g. sedges and Menyanthes trifoliata). Nutrient-rich lakes are found mostly in the south, and typically have dense reed stands, other emergent plants (e.g. Iris pseudacorus and Sparganium erectum), free-floating plants such as Hydrocharis morsus-ranae and Stratiotes aloides, and submerged vegetation with spp. of Potamogeton, Ranunculus etc. The best known lakes in this category are undoubtedly Tåkern and Hornborgasjön.

The coast of Sweden is long, and conditions are quite different at the endpoints. Near the Norwegian border, conditions are typical North Atlantic, turning to subarctic near the Finnish border, where salinity is down to 0,1-0,2 %. A common seashore species there is the endemic, tussock-forming grass Deschampsia bottnica, which survives the destructive force of the up to 2 m thick sea-ice. Common submerged vascular plants in this area, the Gulf of Bothnia, are, among others Myriophyllum sibiricum, Callitriche hermaphroditica and Stuckenia pectinata. On the west coast, one may instead find Zostera marina in similar localities.

Fauna 

According to the IUCN Red List, terrestrial mammals occurring in Sweden include the European hedgehog, the European mole (only in the south), six species of shrews and eighteen of bats. The mountain hare, the Eurasian beaver, the red squirrel as well as about fourteen species of smaller rodents occur. Of the ungulates, the wild boar, red deer, the elk (moose), and the roe deer are found in the country, as well as semidomesticated reindeer. Terrestrial carnivores include the brown bear, the Eurasian wolf, the red fox and, in the mountains the Arctic fox, as well as the Eurasian lynx, the European badger, the Eurasian otter, the stoat, the least weasel, the European polecat, the European pine marten and, in the north, the wolverine. The coast is inhabited by three species of seal: harbour seal in the south and west, ringed seal in the Gulf of Bothnia and grey seal throughout. The porpoise is the only whale that breeds in Swedish waters.

The European rabbit, the European hare and the fallow deer were deliberately introduced, while the racoon dog, mink, muskrat brown rat and house mouse were unintended introductions. All these introductions, perhaps with the exception of the fallow deer, have been "successful", resulting in viable populations.

Sweden's Red List of critically endangered mammals include Bechstein's bat, the common pipistrelle and the Arctic fox, while endangered mammals include the barbastelle, the serotine bat, the pond bat, the lesser noctule and the wolf. Listed as vulnerable are the Eurasian otter, the wolverine, the harbour seal, the harbour porpoise and the Natterer's bat.

According to Avibase: Bird Checklists of the World, 535 species of bird have been recorded in Sweden, but less than half of these breed regularly. Many of these are migratory, making their way between Arctic breeding grounds and overwintering quarters in Europe and Africa. Birds that breed and overwinter in Sweden include tits, corvids, galliformes, owls and several birds of prey.

The only endemic fish in Sweden is the critically endangered freshwater Coregonus trybomi, still surviving in a single lake. Amphibians found in Sweden include eleven species of frogs and toads and two species of newt, while reptiles include four species of snake and three of lizard. They are all protected under the law.

Sweden has an estimated 108 species of butterflies, 60 species of dragonflies and 40 species of wood boring beetles.

Conservation 

Excluding only some of the coldest areas and extremely rocky terrain, the forests of Sweden are intensively managed. Fragments of old growth forest still remain near the mountains, but these mostly lack protection and are rapidly being lost. The native Scots pine and Norway spruce, although often of foreign provenance, are the species most commonly used in forestry. In the interior of northern Sweden, the North American lodgepole pine (Pinus contorta) is preferred, being more productive in those soils and climates.

The network of forestry roads (government supported) is now very dense, their combined length measuring four times that of the circumference of the globe. With such a density, few Swedish forest areas should be referred to as wilderness. Muddus National Park is an example in the far north. Above the tree line, in the mountains, where roads are few and far apart, there are still extensive wilderness areas. Hydroelectric damns, however, negatively affect several of these, both aesthetically and in biodiversity, as at Stora Sjöfallet National Park.

Wet forests and smaller non-forested wetlands are routinely drained when cut which causes drastic ecosystem-shifts and biodiversity loss. In some ways, the situation has improved in the last 30 years or so. For example, herbicide spraying against deciduous trees from aeroplanes is no longer done. Nowadays it is common to leave some individual dead and living trees and patches of forest in otherwise clear-cut areas. Many new nature reserves have also been created in recent years. 

Climate change is likely to have an effect on the country's biodiversity, with the treeline moving further north and to higher altitudes, and forests replacing tundra. The melting of ice will increase runoff, affecting wetlands. With a rise in sea level, the Baltic Sea will receive greater inflow of saline water.

References 

Sweden
Biota of Sweden